Peter Joseph Millett  (born 23 January 1955) is a British diplomat who was ambassador to Libya 2015–2018.

Early life 
Peter Millett attended the independent school St. Joseph’s College in Ipswich.

Career
Peter Millett joined the Foreign Office in 1974 and had early postings in Quito and Caracas. In 1980 he studied Arabic and then worked in Doha. On return to London he bridged to the Fast Stream and worked in the Private Office of the Foreign Office Minister in the House of Lords. He then worked at the UK Representation to the European Union specialising in energy and nuclear issues. Back in London, he worked on personnel policy followed by 4 years as Deputy Head of Mission in Athens. On return to London, he worked as Director for Security.

Millett then spent 12 years as a head of mission, as High Commissioner in Cyprus (2005-10), Ambassador in Jordan (2011-15) and Ambassador in Libya (2015-18). He was appointed CMG in 2013.

After retiring in 2018 Millett has worked as a consultant for British companies working in Libya and the Middle East. He is Chairman of Mowgli Mentoring, Chairman of the Libya British Business Council and a Trustee of Arts4Dementia, Global Partners Governance Foundation and Peaceful Change Initiative.

Personal life 
Millett married June Harnett in 1981. They have three daughters.

References
MILLETT, Peter Joseph, Who's Who 2014, A & C Black, 2014 (online edition, Oxford University Press, 2014)

External links
 (Foreign & Commonwealth Office, 15 August 2013)
Ambassador Peter Millett: Britain and the Middle East (lecture), Columbia University, 10 November 2014

1955 births
Living people
High Commissioners of the United Kingdom to Cyprus
Ambassadors of the United Kingdom to Jordan
Ambassadors of the United Kingdom to Libya
Companions of the Order of St Michael and St George